Thomas Fells (1890–1942) was an English footballer who played as a full back for South Kirkby, Rotherham County and Brentford

Playing career
Fells began his football career with Rotherham County at least as early as 1907 who were regulars in the FA Cup at that time. He next joined South Kirkby then joined Brentford in 1912. In the 1912–13 season he made 8 appearances for Brentford and in 1913–14 he made 7 appearances. In total he made 15 appearances for Brentford. After World War One, Tommy Fells is known to have returned to South Kirkby Colliery in 1919.

References

1890 births
1942 deaths
English footballers
Association football defenders
South Kirkby Colliery F.C. players
Brentford F.C. players
Rotherham County F.C. players